The Manchester Building Society is a building society which offers savings accounts via its branch in Manchester City Centre at 125 Portland Street, Manchester, England

It is a member of the Building Societies Association and Financial Ombudsman Service, as well as the FSCS deposit guarantee scheme.

As a mutual, they are owned by and operated for their members.

They self-proclaim to operate a streamlined organisation, based in the heart of Manchester, which they assert allows them to keep costs to a minimum and pass on the benefits to members.

Since 2016, the society has been forced by its regulator, the PRA, to no longer undertake new lending on the basis it has insufficient capital on its balance sheet to mitigate risks of new business. A capital shortfall as a result of historic accounting errors is blamed. Nevertheless, the society continues to service historic mortgages issued pre 2016, accepting new deposits and applications by individuals to open personal savings accounts and retaining statutory minimum deposit insurance for its members. However, the society stopped paying PIBS holders interest since 2016, leaving many investors out of pocket.

The society have continually taken predecessor auditors, Grant Thornton, whom they believe to have acted negligent and ultimately resulting in their capital concerns, to court. Towards the end of 2018 they were awarded a negligible sum versus the initial claim, and forced to pay Grant Thornton's costs which were far in excess of the award. The society took this decision to the Supreme Court and in June 2021 they decided to overthrow the lower courts decision - the society and Grant Thornton are now in discussion of the mechanisms to award damages and interest to the sum of around £13.4m. The society confirmed at the start of 2019 that there continues to be uncertainty around their long-term future, with this payout giving some reassurance to PIBS investors who were left out of pocket since interest payments were suspended in 2016.

The society were subsequently audited by KPMG, shortly after which they were replaced by PwC who continue to audit them to date – both part of the global and local ‘Big 4’, of which Grant Thornton is not a constituent.

Unusually for a UK-based organisation the society historically offered its members lifetime mortgages against properties in Spain, a form of indebtedness taken on in later life with the aim of never making interest payments or paying down the principal in the borrower's lifetime. On death lien on the property continues to be held by the society until full repayment is made.

In February 2023 it was confirmed that the society had agreed to merge with the Newcastle Building Society. The merger was expected to be completed by July 1st 2023.

References

External links
Manchester Building Society
Building Societies Association
KPMG Building Societies Database 2008

Building societies of England
Banks established in 1922
Organizations established in 1922
Organisations based in Manchester
1922 establishments in England